Moroccan black soap or beldi soap is a kind of soap originating in Morocco. It is a high-alkaline Castile soap made from olive oil and macerated olives with a gel-like consistency. This gives the soap its characteristic dark greenish-black color.

A pinch of soap is rubbed onto wet skin. The soap is high in Vitamin E. Moroccan black soap should not be confused with African black soap, as the ingredients and place of manufacture are quite different.

References 

Soaps